Homenmen Sports Association Beirut, or simply Homenmen, is a Lebanese-Armenian multi-sports club based in Beirut, Lebanon, section of the pan-Armenian sports and scouting organisation of the same name. 

Homenmen's activities also include table tennis, cycling, as well as a scouting program.

History
Following the foundation of Homenmen on 27 January 1921, the Lebanese branch was formed in 1924. The club was among the founding members of the Lebanese Football Association in 1933. They were affiliated with the Hunchak party.

Homenmen played various clubs worldwide, most notably Hajduk Split in Yugoslavia in 1945, Al Ahly and Zamalek in Egypt in 1969, as well as multiple trips to Armenia. In 1995, they represented Lebanon at the Asian Cup Winners' Cup, and were eliminated in the second round. Homenmen participated once more, in 1999, where they were eliminated in the first round.

Homenmen's football team have won the Lebanese Premier League four times, in 1945, 1954, 1957 and 1961, and the Lebanese Elite Cup in 1999. They have also finished runners-up in the Lebanese FA Cup four times (1993, 1994, 1998 and 1999), and in the Lebanese Super Cup in 1999.

Among the most prominent historical players of Homenmen are Mardik Tchaparian, Babken Melikyan, Ahmad Sakr and Gevorg Karapetyan.

Rivalries 
Homenmen have a historic rivalry with fellow-Lebanese-Armenian club Homenetmen.

Players

Notable players

Honours
 Lebanese Premier League
 Winners (4): 1945, 1954, 1957, 1961
 Lebanese Elite Cup
 Winners (1): 1999
 Lebanese FA Cup
 Runners-up (4): 1992–93, 1993–94, 1997–98, 1998–99
 Lebanese Super Cup
 Runners-up (2): 1998, 1999

Asian record
Asian Cup Winners' Cup: 2 appearances
1995: Second Round
1999–00: First Round

See also 

 Armenians in Lebanon
 List of football clubs in Lebanon

References

 
1921 establishments in Lebanon
Association football clubs established in 1921
Armenian association football clubs outside Armenia
Armenian football clubs in Lebanon
Diaspora sports clubs
Football clubs in Lebanon
Sport in Beirut
Organisations based in Beirut
Scouting and Guiding in Lebanon